Baraty (Borootoi) is a rural locality (a settlement) in Selenginsky District, Republic of Buryatia, Russia. The population was 589 as of 2010. There are 14 streets.

Geography 
Baraty is located 20 km southwest of Gusinoozyorsk (the district's administrative centre) by road. Zagustay is the nearest rural locality.

References 

Rural localities in Selenginsky District